The Point Pleasant Canal is a canal in Point Pleasant, New Jersey. It was completed in 1925 to connect the Manasquan Inlet and Manasquan River with Bay Head Harbor on the northern end of Barnegat Bay. The canal is part of the Intracoastal Waterway.

With the completion of the canal, the Barnegat Peninsula effectively became an island. The island is connected to the mainland by two lift bridges spanning the canal; as well as three bridges to the south which cross the Barnegat Bay. The bridges, at Route 88, at Bridge Avenue (the Lovelandtown Bridge), at Mantoloking Road (the Mantoloking Bridge), and two bridges at Route 37 (the Thomas A. Mathis Bridge and the J. Stanley Tunney Bridge), open on demand,  halting motor traffic to allow boats to pass underneath as marine traffic has the right of way.

References

External links 
 Point Pleasant History Site
 Jerry Woolley and Jeff Heim

Canals in New Jersey
Intracoastal Waterway
Transportation buildings and structures in Ocean County, New Jersey
Canals opened in 1925